USS Hydra (AK-82), ex MV Eben H. Linnell, was an  commissioned by the U.S. Navy for cargo service in World War II. Hydra was in naval service from 1 January through 19 November 1943 before she was transferred to the U.S. Army for conversion to the Engineer Port Repair ship Madison Jordan Manchester.

Construction

Constructed as a Maritime Commission N3-M-A1 type, initially under Maritime Commission contract by Penn-Jersey Ship Building Co., Camden, New Jersey as MV Eben H. Linnell, with the contract being transferred to Navy during construction. The ship was acquired by the Navy 1 January 1943 before launch on 23 January 1943.

Naval Service

The ship was converted for naval service at Bethlehem Steel, Key Highway, Baltimore, with completion on 27 May 1943. Hydra commissioned 25 September 1943, and arrived at Norfolk, Virginia, 1 October to prepare for her shakedown. For the next month she engaged in various operations, including speed trials and target runs in the Chesapeake Bay. She was loading cargo in Norfolk, Virginia upon transfer to the Army and departed in early November for Boston Harbor 5 November to begin the transfer process where she was decommissioned 19 November 1943 and transferred to the Army the same day.

Army Service

Hydra was renamed by the Army as the Engineer Port Repair ship Madison Jordan Manchester after an Engineer officer killed in the war. Conversion began in the second week of December 1943 with delays plaguing the program and scheduled completion delayed until 31 March 1944. Crew training further delayed the ship. Sailing for the European Theater was not until 8 November 1944 from New York in Convoy HX 303.

Fate

The ship was returned to the Maritime Commission and arrived in the James River National Defense Reserve Fleet on 20 August 1947. There, the ship was put into use on 15 July 1985 as Fleet Service Craft (SS-27) to support maintenance of the fleet until disposal 24 May 1994. Madison Jordan Manchester was berthed at Fairfield Terminal at Baltimore, Maryland before scrapping there.

Notes

References

External links 
  (aka USAT Madison Jordan Manchester)
 

Port repair ships of the United States Army
Enceladus-class cargo ships
Ships built in Camden, New Jersey
1943 ships
Type N3 ships of the United States Army
World War II auxiliary ships of the United States